Delta Charter Township, officially known as the Charter Township of Delta and commonly known as simply Delta Township, is a charter township of Eaton County in the U.S. state of Michigan. As of the 2020 census, it had a population of 33,119 making it the most populous municipality in Eaton County. The township operates its own fire department, but contracts with the Eaton County Sheriff Department for police protection. The township is a major community in metropolitan Lansing.

Communities
Delta Mills is an unincorporated community within the north-central of township on the Grand River immediately north of the Webster Street bridge. It lies between the cities of Grand Ledge on the west and Lansing on the east. It was first settled in 1836 and platted as "Grand River City" in 1841, but never incorporated. The community became known as Delta Mills due to the grist mill located there and the township.
Delta Center is an unincorporated community located near the center of the township at Canal Street and St. Joseph Highway.  It was the original location of the township hall built in the 1870s and serving until 1955 when it was moved up Canal where it intersects with Saginaw Highway.
Millett (originally Millett's Station) is a populated place within the southwest corner of the township and located east of Creyts Road, west of Waverly Road, and along Lansing Road.  The old Millett School building, the former Grand Trunk Western's Millett railroad depot and the Woldumar Nature Center are located there. The village was platted in 1874 by former Eaton County sheriff Silas Millett.
Waverly is a Census-designated place (CDP) used for statistical purposes and has no legal status as a municipality. The population was 23,925 at the 2010 census, containing most of the urbanized population of the township.

Geography

The agreements facilitated the construction of the Lansing Delta Township Assembly Plant as well as three auto suppliers.

Demographics

2010
As of the census of 2010, there were 32,408 people, 14,201 households, and 8,572 families residing in the township. The racial makeup of the township was 76.8% White, 11.6% African American, 0.5% Native American, 3.8% Asian, 0.0% Pacific Islander, 1.9% from other races, and 3.6% from two or more races. Hispanic or Latino of any race were 6.2% of the population.

2000
There were 12,559 households, out of which 28.4% had children under the age of 18 living with them, 52.1% were married couples living together, 9.4% had a female householder with no husband present, and 35.7% were non-families. 29.4% of all households were made up of individuals, and 9.0% had someone living alone who was 65 years of age or older.  The average household size was 2.33 and the average family size was 2.92.

In the township the population was spread out, with 22.9% under the age of 18, 9.5% from 18 to 24, 28.0% from 25 to 44, 26.5% from 45 to 64, and 13.1% who were 65 years of age or older.  The median age was 38 years. For every 100 females, there were 89.5 males.  For every 100 females age 18 and over, there were 86.3 males.

The median income for a household in the township was $52,711, and the median income for a family was $65,429. Males had a median income of $48,520 versus $32,776 for females. The per capita income for the township was $27,048.  About 3.8% of families and 5.0% of the population were below the poverty line, including 5.8% of those under age 18 and 6.4% of those age 65 or over.

Transportation

Three major Interstate Highways pass through Delta Charter Township and include Interstate 69 (I-69), I-96, and I-496.  Saginaw Highway (M-43) is the major thoroughfare with many commercial businesses located along the road.

Eaton County Transportation Authority (EATRAN) and the Capital Area Transportation Authority (CATA) both provide public transportation services to the area.
Amtrak provides intercity passenger service, in nearby East Lansing, on the Chicago to Port Huron Blue Water line.

Class one rail freight service is provided by Canadian National Railway (CN), operating out of a rail yard along Snow Road, Mt. Hope Highway and Lansing Road.  The yard mainly handles automobile, coal, grain, and lumber loads for local industries.

References

External links
Official Website of the Charter Township of Delta

Townships in Eaton County, Michigan
Charter townships in Michigan
Lansing–East Lansing metropolitan area
Populated places established in 1837